McMartin is a surname. Notable people with the surname include:

 Alexander McMartin (1788–1853), Canadian politician
 Barbara McMartin (1931–2005), Adirondack author and environmentalist
 Duncan McMartin Jr. (1776–1837), New York politician

See also
 The McMartin preschool trial, high-profile trial on child sexual abuse